Eremophila glutinosa, commonly known as sticky emu bush, is a flowering plant in the figwort family, Scrophulariaceae and is endemic to Western Australia. It is an erect, densely foliaged shrub with branches and leaves sticky and shiny due to the presence of resin. It has hairy sepals and lilac-coloured flowers.

Description

The tube is a shade of lilac with dark spots inside the tube and on part of the lobes. The outside of the tube is sparsely hairy, the inside of the lobes glabrous and the inside of the tube is densely woolly. The 4 stamens are fully enclosed in the tube.

Taxonomy and naming
The species was first formally described by Robert Chinnock in 1979 and the description was published in Journal of the Adelaide Botanic Garden. The specific epithet (glutinosa) is a Latin word meaning "sticky" or "viscous",  referring to the sticky leaves of this species.

Distribution and habitat
Eremophila glutinosa usually grows on rocky hills, on granite outcrops or along temporary watercourses in clay or sandy soils between Laverton and Mount Augustus in the Avon Wheatbelt, Gascoyne, Murchison and Yalgoo biogeographic regions.

Conservation status
Sticky emu bush is classified as "not threatened" by the Western Australian Government Department of Parks and Wildlife.

Use in horticulture
This eremophila is not well known in cultivation and has generally only been grown by propagating onto Myoporum rootstock. It grows in full sun or partial shade but needs protection from frosts.

References

glutinosa
Eudicots of Western Australia
Plants described in 1979
Endemic flora of Western Australia
Taxa named by Robert Chinnock